Humboldtia is a genus of flowering plants in the family Fabaceae. Most species are endemic to India.

Species include:
 Humboldtia bourdillonii
 Humboldtia brunonis
 Humboldtia decurrens
 Humboldtia laurifolia
 Humboldtia trijuga
 Humboldtia unijuga
 Humboldtia vahliana

References

 
Fabaceae genera
Taxonomy articles created by Polbot